Saklıkent National Park, established on June 6, 1996, is a national park in southwestern Turkey. The national park is a canyon, and is located in Muğla Province, at Seydikemer,   far from Fethiye. Thé Canyon is 65 km from Kaş in the Antalya province.

It was formed through abrasion of the rocks by flowing waters over thousands of years. As the level of water rises during winter months, visitors can enter the canyon all year around only the deeper parts in the summer.  of the canyon are walkable after April, when most of the snow in the Taurus Mountains has melted and passed through on its way to the Mediterranean Sea. Saklıkent means "hidden city" in Turkish.
The full length of 16 km is only possible to discover with professional equipment and knowledge of advanced canyoning. Some adventure centers offer guided tours with an overnight Biwak camp and about 30 waterfalls to rappel..

Gallery

External links 
 Saklıkent Canyon Photos on Flickr

National parks of Turkey
Canyons and gorges of Turkey
Geography of Muğla Province
Landforms of Muğla Province
Tourist attractions in Muğla Province
Fethiye
1996 establishments in Turkey
Protected areas established in 1996